Nagazeh may refer to one of two villages in Iran:
 Nagazeh-ye Bozorg
 Nagazeh-ye Kuchak